Lukas Vischer (23 November 1926, Basel, Switzerland - 11 March 2008, Geneva) was a Swiss Reformed theologian, author, and advocate of ecumenical dialogue among the world's Christian churches. 

Vischer studied theology in Basel, Göttingen, and Strasbourg and spent one semester at Oxford University. He was ordained in 1950, received a doctorate of theology in 1952, and, in 1953, he was appointed as Reformed minister in Herblingen, a small Swiss industrial town near Schaffhausen. 

Vischer's tenure with the World Council of Churches began in 1961 with his appointment as research secretary on the council's Commission on Faith and Order. From 1962 to 1965, he was a WCC observer at the Second Vatican Council. He was director of the Faith and Order Commission from 1966 to 1979, then director of the Protestant Office for Ecumenicism in Bern. He was moderator of the theological department of the World Alliance of Reformed Churches from 1982 to 1989. 

Vischer wrote numerous books, several of which have been published in English. He held a professorship in ecumenical theology at Berne and was a member of the European Christian Environmental Network. 

He married Barbara Schmidt in 1953 and they had four children.

Books
The Common Catechism: A Book of Christian Faith, 1975. 
Intercession, 1980. 
Spirit of God, Spirit of Christ: Ecumenical Reflections on the Filioque Controversy, 1981. 
Christian Worship in Reformed Churches Past and Present, 2003. 
Commemorating Witnesses and Martyrs of the Past: A Reformed Perspective, 2006.

External links
Letter from WCC general secretary Rev. Dr Samuel Kobia, to Prof. Dr Lukas Vischer, on the occasion of his 80th birthday
Letter from WCC general secretary Rev. Dr Samuel Kobia, to Prof. Dr Lukas Vischer, on the occasion of his death
pictures Symposion 80th birthday November 24th 2006, Bern Switzerland
Lukas Vischer: a tower of strength and a sharp theological mind

People from Basel-Stadt
Swiss Calvinist and Reformed theologians
1926 births
2008 deaths
20th-century Calvinist and Reformed theologians